Tara Performing Arts High School (officially Tara Institute of the Performing Arts) is a performing arts focused Waldorf high school in North Boulder, Colorado. It is one of the few, if not the only performing arts focused Waldorf high schools in the United States, if not the world.

History
Tara Performing Arts High School was founded on March 17, 1994. It began as an after-school program for middle schoolers, and developed into a high school in 1997. It graduated its first class in 2001.

References

External links

Schools in Boulder County, Colorado
1994 establishments in Colorado
Educational institutions established in 1994